Jacek Moskwa (born 1948) is a Polish journalist and writer. He cooperated with many of the most notable Media in Poland, including the Television News Agency, Życie Warszawy, Gazeta Wyborcza, Rzeczpospolita and Radio Zet. 

After 1990 Moskwa for several years worked as a correspondent of the Polish media in Rome and was one of the few Polish journalists accredited at the Vatican.

Bibliography
 
 
 
 
 
 
 
  - a long interview with Olek Mincer, a Polish Jew to play Nicodemus
 - biography of the pope Karol Wojtyła,  ]

References

1948 births
Living people
Polish journalists
Polish Roman Catholics